Kante may refer to:

 Kante (surname), a surname of African origin
 Kante, Nepal
 Kante, Tajikistan

See also
 Kanté, a surname
 Kaante, a 2002 Indian Hindi-language film